Mascot Manor refers to a fictional house in which the Australian Football League (AFL) club mascots live. Prior to 2003, each AFL club had mascots; however, in order to appeal to Auskick players, a common theme was decided upon for club mascots. Most clubs have an historical link with their mascots. The story begins with Toby "Torpedo" Coleman, a young, Northern Territory boy who dreams of playing AFL, stumbling across "Mascot Manor" where the 18 mascots live.  Some clubs have since moved away from the Mascot Manor character to a mascot of their own choosing.

In 2009, Tru Blu Entertainment published a Nintendo DS game adaptation, developed by Wicked Witch Software based on Mascot Manor.

List of mascots

References

Australian Football League
2003 establishments in Australia